Jan Suchý (10 October 1944 – 24 August 2021) was an ice hockey player from Německý Brod, Czechoslovakia.  He was sometimes referred to as the "European Bobby Orr".

From the ages of 8 to 19, Suchý played for a local team, Jiskra Havlíčkův Brod. He then played for the Czechoslovakian army team Dukla Jihlava from 1963 to 1979, during which time he helped them win seven Czechoslovakian league titles. By his last season he had scored more goals than any defenceman in league history. He then continued to play in Austria and Germany until 1984.

He played in the Czechoslovakia national team in the world championships of 1965, 1966, 1968–71, 1973 and 1974, scoring 22 goals in 68 games, and winning four silver medals and three bronze medals. He also played in the ice hockey tournament of the 1968 Winter Olympics, winning a silver medal with his team.

Suchý won the first two Golden Hockey Stick awards as Czechoslovakia's best player in 1969 and 1970. He was named the best defenceman at the ice hockey world championships in 1969 and 1971.

He was also the first European to be placed on an NHL protected list (by the Boston Bruins).

Notes

References

External links
 
 Jan Suchý

1944 births
2021 deaths
Czech ice hockey defencemen
Czechoslovak ice hockey defencemen
HC Dukla Jihlava players
Ice hockey players at the 1968 Winter Olympics
Medalists at the 1968 Winter Olympics
Olympic ice hockey players of Czechoslovakia
Olympic medalists in ice hockey
Olympic silver medalists for Czechoslovakia
Sportspeople from Havlíčkův Brod
IIHF Hall of Fame inductees
Czechoslovak expatriate sportspeople in Austria
Czechoslovak expatriate sportspeople in West Germany
Czechoslovak expatriate ice hockey people
Expatriate ice hockey players in West Germany
Expatriate ice hockey players in Austria